Helge Muxoll Schrøder (27 November 1924 – 2 March 2012) was a Danish rower who competed in the 1948 Summer Olympics and in the 1952 Summer Olympics. He was born in Horsens. In 1948, he was a crew member of the Danish boat which won the silver medal in the coxless fours event. Four years later, he was eliminated with the Danish boat in the semi-final repechage of the eight competition. He died in 2012 in Jonstorp, Sweden.

References

1924 births
2012 deaths
Danish male rowers
Olympic rowers of Denmark
Rowers at the 1948 Summer Olympics
Rowers at the 1952 Summer Olympics
Olympic silver medalists for Denmark
Olympic medalists in rowing
People from Horsens
Medalists at the 1948 Summer Olympics
European Rowing Championships medalists
Sportspeople from the Central Denmark Region